Woodburn Bridge is a historic truss bridge in Indianola, Mississippi.

The Pratt truss/swing truss bridge was built in 1916. The bridge was abandoned in 1985. The structure was added to the National Register of Historic Places in 1988.

References

External links

Road bridges on the National Register of Historic Places in Mississippi
Bridges completed in 1916
Drawbridges on the National Register of Historic Places
Swing bridges in the United States
National Register of Historic Places in Sunflower County, Mississippi
Pratt truss bridges in the United States
Metal bridges in the United States